Pristimantis luteolateralis is a species of frog in the family Strabomantidae.
It is endemic to Ecuador.
Its natural habitats are tropical moist montane forests, pastureland, plantations, rural gardens, and heavily degraded former forest.

References

luteolateralis
Amphibians of Ecuador
Endemic fauna of Ecuador
Amphibians described in 1976
Taxonomy articles created by Polbot